Khvorshidabad or Khowrshidabad may refer to:
 Khvorshidabad, Ardabil
 Khvorshidabad, Mazandaran
 Khvorshidabad, Yazd